This list of water supply and sanitation by country provides information on the status of water supply and sanitation at a national or, in some cases, also regional level.

Water supply and sanitation by country
 Water supply and sanitation in Afghanistan
 Water supply and sanitation in Algeria
 Water supply and sanitation in Argentina
 Water supply and sanitation in Australia
 Water supply and sanitation in Bangladesh
 Water supply and sanitation in Belgium
 Water supply and sanitation in Benin
 Water supply and sanitation in Bolivia
 Water supply and sanitation in Brazil
 Water supply and sanitation in Burkina Faso
 Water supply and sanitation in Cambodia
 Water supply and sanitation in Canada
 Water supply and sanitation in Chile
 Water supply and sanitation in China 
 Water supply and sanitation in Colombia
 Water supply and sanitation in Costa Rica
 Water supply and sanitation in Cuba 
 Water supply and sanitation in Denmark
 Water supply and sanitation in the Dominican Republic
 Water supply and sanitation in Ecuador
 Water supply and sanitation in Egypt
 Water supply and sanitation in El Salvador
 Water supply and sanitation in England and Wales
 Water supply and sanitation in Ethiopia
 Water supply and sanitation in France 
 Water supply and sanitation in Germany 
 Water supply and sanitation in Ghana
 Water supply and sanitation in Gibraltar
 Water supply and sanitation in Greece 
 Water supply and sanitation in Guatemala
 Water supply and sanitation in Guyana
 Water supply and sanitation in Haiti
 Water supply and sanitation in Honduras 
 Water supply and sanitation in Hong Kong 
 Water supply and sanitation in India
 Water supply and sanitation in Indonesia 
 Water supply and sanitation in Iran
 Water supply and sanitation in Iraq
 Water supply and sanitation in the Republic of Ireland
 Water supply and sanitation in Israel
 Water supply and sanitation in Italy
 Water supply and sanitation in Jamaica
 Water supply and sanitation in Japan 
 Water supply and sanitation in Jordan
 Water supply and sanitation in Kenya
 Water supply and sanitation in Lebanon
 Water supply and sanitation in Malaysia 
 Water supply and sanitation in Mexico 
 Water supply and sanitation in Morocco
 Water supply and sanitation in Mozambique
 Water supply and sanitation in Namibia
 Water supply and sanitation in the Netherlands 
 Water supply and sanitation in New Zealand
 Water supply and sanitation in Nicaragua
 Water supply and sanitation in Nigeria
 Water supply and sanitation in Pakistan
 Water supply and sanitation in the Palestinian territories 
 Water supply and sanitation in Panama
 Water supply and sanitation in Paraguay
 Water supply and sanitation in Peru 
 Water supply and sanitation in the Philippines
 Water supply and sanitation in Portugal 
 Water supply and sanitation in Russia 
 Water supply and sanitation in Rwanda
 Water supply and sanitation in Saudi Arabia
 Water supply and sanitation in Scotland
 Water supply and sanitation in Senegal
 Water supply and sanitation in Sierra Leone
 Water supply and sanitation in Singapore 
 Water supply and sanitation in South Africa 
 Water supply and sanitation in South Sudan 
 Water supply and sanitation in Spain 
 Water supply and sanitation in Syria 
 Water supply and sanitation in Tanzania 
 Water supply and sanitation in Trinidad and Tobago 
 Water supply and sanitation in Tunisia
 Water supply and sanitation in Turkey
 Water supply and sanitation in Uganda
 Water supply and sanitation in the United Kingdom
 Water supply and sanitation in the United States
 Water supply and sanitation in Uruguay
 Water supply and sanitation in Venezuela
 Water supply and sanitation in Vietnam
 Water supply and sanitation in Yemen
 Water supply and sanitation in Zambia
 Water supply and sanitation in Zimbabwe

Lists by region
Water supply and sanitation in the European Union
 Water supply and sanitation in Latin America
 Water supply and sanitation in Sub-Saharan Africa
 List of responsibilities in the water supply and sanitation sector in Latin America and the Caribbean

List of water resource management by country 
This list of water resources management by country provides information on the status of water resource management at a national level.

List by country:
 Water resources management in Argentina
 Water resources management in Brazil
 Water resources management in Chile
 Water resources management in Colombia
 Water resources management in Costa Rica
 Water resources management in the Dominican Republic
 Water resources management in modern Egypt
 Water resources management in El Salvador
 Water resources management in Guatemala
 Water resources management in Honduras
 Water resources management in Jamaica
 Water resources management in Mexico
 Water resources management in Nicaragua
 Water resources management in Pakistan
 Water resources management in Peru
 Water resources management in Syria
 Water resources management in Uruguay

See also 

 List of countries by proportion of the population using improved sanitation facilities
 List of abbreviations used in sanitation
 Popular pages amongst water supply and sanitation by country
 WikiProject Sanitation
 WikiProject Water
 WikiProject Water supply and sanitation by country
 Sanitation
 Water supply

Sanitation
Sewerage

Water supply and sanitation